The Road Hustlers is a 1968 American action film directed by Larry E. Jackson and starring Jim Davis, Scott Brady and Bruce Yarnell. It was shot on location in North Carolina.

Plot

Cast
 Jim Davis as Noah Reedy 
 Scott Brady as Earl Veasey 
 Bruce Yarnell as Matt Reedy 
 Robert Dix as Mark Reedy 
 Victoria Carroll as Nadine 
 Andy Devine as Sheriff Estep 
 Sue Raney as Helen 
 Robert V. Barron as Luke Reedy 
 Theodore Lehmann as Hagar 
 John 'Bud' Cardos as Chandler 
 Bill McKinney as Hays 
 Bill MacDowell as Bassett 
 Jack Lester as Eskie 
 Sid Lawrence as Deke 
 Derek Hughes as Ted 
 Monica Davis as Martha Lu 
 Marshall Lockhart as Nelly 
 Jim E. Quick as Imhoff 
 Jack Morey as Harrison 
 Byrd Holland as Agent

References

Bibliography
 Balducci, Anthony. Richard Pryor in Hollywood: The Narrative Films, 1967-1997. McFarland, 2018.

External links
 

1968 films
1960s action films
1960s English-language films
American action films
American International Pictures films
Films shot in North Carolina
1960s American films